Events in the year 2021 in Togo.

Incumbents
 President: Faure Gnassingbé
 Prime Minister: Victoire Tomegah Dogbé

Events
Ongoing — COVID-19 pandemic in Togo

Deaths
9 April – Dahuku Péré, politician (born 1953).

References

 
2020s in Togo
Years of the 21st century in Togo
Togo
Togo